Dunure railway station was a railway station serving the village of Dunure, South Ayrshire, Scotland. The station was part of the Maidens and Dunure Light Railway.

History 
The station opened on 17 May 1906. It closed on 1 December 1930, but reopened briefly between 4 July 1932 and 1 June 1933.

The station consisted of an island platform, accessed from the road bridge at the end of the platform. The overgrown island platform still exists today.

References

Notes

Sources 
 
 
 
 Article in British Railway Journal No 8 Summer 1985 Wild Swan Publications

Disused railway stations in South Ayrshire
Railway stations in Great Britain opened in 1906
Railway stations in Great Britain closed in 1930
Railway stations in Great Britain opened in 1932
Railway stations in Great Britain closed in 1933
Former Glasgow and South Western Railway stations